Michael Best & Friedrich LLP (commonly, referred to as "Michael Best") is a U.S. national law firm with more than 300 attorneys across 19 domestic offices. The firm ranked 169th on The American Lawyers 2021 Am Law 200 rankings.

History

Michael Best was founded in 1848 by Edward George Ryan, a Wisconsin trial attorney who later served as Chief Justice of the Wisconsin Supreme Court. Over the course of more than a hundred and seventy years, the firm expanded throughout Wisconsin and across the country through a series of expansions and mergers, eventually growing from a small legal practice to a full-service business law firm that serves clients in the United States and across the globe.

Practice areas

Michael Best's primary practice areas include corporate, government relations, public policy, political law, intellectual property, labor and employment, litigation, privacy & cybersecurity, real estate, regulatory, tax, and estate planning. Other areas of practice the firm is known for include banking & financial services law, energy, environmental & natural resources law, and life sciences.

Attorney compensation

The starting associate salary ranges from $160,000-$190,000 per year pending location and practice.

Affiliations

Michael Best is affiliated with various global law organizations, including Lex Mundi, a network of 160 law firms with over 21,000 attorneys in more than 100 countries; the Employment Law Alliance (ELA), a global network of employment and labor law firms; and the American Property Tax Counsel (APTC), a national affiliation of property tax law firms that provides major portfolio owners with a single source of tax advice.

Notable alumni
 William A. Bablitch, Justice of the Wisconsin Supreme Court (1983-2003) 
 Steven M. Biskupic, former United States Attorney for the Eastern District of Wisconsin 
 David J. Cannon, former United States Attorney for the Eastern District of Wisconsin
 Stephen L. Crocker, United States Magistrate Judge for the Western District of Wisconsin (1992–Present) 
 Michelle L. Jacobs, former United States Attorney for the Eastern District of Wisconsin 
 Reince Priebus, Chairman of the Republican National Committee (2011–2017) and White House Chief of Staff (2017) 
 Edward George Ryan, Chief Justice of the Wisconsin Supreme Court (1874-1880) 
 Stefan Passantino - Ethics attorney in the administration of President Donald J. Trump

References

External links
 

Law firms established in 1848
Law firms based in Milwaukee
Law firms based in Wisconsin
1848 establishments in Wisconsin